Talanga advenalis is a moth of the family Crambidae. It was described by Snellen in 1895. It is found in Indonesia (Java).

References

Moths described in 1895
Spilomelinae
Moths of Indonesia